The Bengali Language Movement was a political effort in East Pakistan (now Bangladesh) that advocated the adoption of Bengali as an official language. The movement faced violent opposition by the government before finally succeeding. Numerous songs, poems, novels and plays were written to commemorate the movement, as well as films and memoirs.

Songs
Ekusher Gaan (The Song of Twentyfirst) by Abdul Gaffar Choudhury
Ora Amar Mukher Kotha (They are my Words) by Abdul Latif
Ekushey February (21 February) by Kabir Suman

Poems
Kadte Ashini Fashir Dabi Niye Ashechi (I have not come to mourn but to appeal for hanging) by Mahbub Ul Alam Choudhury
Bornomala, Amar Dukhini Bornomala by Shamsur Rahman
February 1969 by Shamsur Rahman
Amake ki malyo debe dao by Nirmalendu Goon
Chithi by Abu Zafar Obaidullah
Shobhyotar Monibondhe by Syed Shamsul Haque

Sculpture and architecture
 Shaheed Minar ( "Martyr Monument") in Dhaka, Bangladesh.
 Moder Gorob (Our Pride ) – is a sculpture situated in front of Bangla Academy building in Dhaka, Bangladesh.
 Bhasha Smritistambha (Language Monument) – located at Deshapriya Park, Kolkata, India.
 Bhasha Shahid Smarak (Language Martyrs Memorial) – at Ekushe Udyan park, Kolkata, India.

Novels
Ekushey February by Zahir Raihan
Artonaad by Shawkat Osman
Nirontor Ghontadhoni by Selina Hossain

Films
Jibon Theke Neya (Taken from Life) directed by Zahir Raihan
 Bangla directed by Shahidul Islam Khokon
 Fagun Haway (In Spring breeze) directed by Tauquir Ahmed

Stage play
Kobor (Grave) by Munier Chowdhury

Things named after the movement
Ekushey Padak, the second highest civilian award in Bangladesh
Ekushey Book Fair, the national book fair of Bangladesh
Ekushey Television, the first private terrestrial TV channel in Bangladesh
Ekushe Udyan, park in Kolkata, West Bengal, India
Bhasha Udyan, part of Surendra Nath park in Kolkata, West Bengal

See also
 Artistic depictions of Bangladesh Liberation War

References

Linguistic history of Bangladesh
Bengali language movement
Bengali language